Kragerø Station was a railway station located in Kragerø, Norway on the Kragerø Line.

History
The station was opened on December 2, 1927 when the Sørlandet Line was opened to Kragerø from Lunde Station. In 1935 the line was made the branch Kragerø Line when the Sørlandet Line was extended to Arendal Station. Passenger traffic was terminated in 1988, and since the line has been abandoned and razed. The station is now used as a bus station and tourist information.

Railway stations on the Sørlandet Line
Railway stations in Vestfold og Telemark
Railway stations opened in 1927
Railway stations closed in 1988
Disused railway stations in Norway
1927 establishments in Norway
1988 disestablishments in Norway